Julián de Olivares (10 December 1895 – 23 October 1977) was a Spanish fencer. He competed in the individual and team sabre events at the 1924 Summer Olympics.

References

External links
 

1895 births
1977 deaths
Spanish male sabre fencers
Olympic fencers of Spain
Fencers at the 1924 Summer Olympics